Webster's Forest is a historic home located at Churchville, Harford County, Maryland, United States. It is a stone house constructed in two sections. The pre-1800 eastern section stands three bays wide, one and a half stories tall above a high basement, with a gambrel roof. Despite severe damage by fire in 1966, exterior walls, chimney, floor structures, most of the flooring, and portions of the cornice of this section remains original. The two-bay, gable-roofed west addition appears to date from the second quarter of the 19th century.

Webster's Forest was listed on the National Register of Historic Places in 1983.

References

External links
, including photo from 1979, Maryland Historical Trust website

Houses in Harford County, Maryland
Houses on the National Register of Historic Places in Maryland
Houses completed in 1835
Churchville, Maryland
National Register of Historic Places in Harford County, Maryland